On 14 August 2017, a car deliberately rammed into a busy pizzeria restaurant in Sept-Sorts, a village about  east from Paris, France. The attack resulted in the death of a 13-year-old girl and injuries to 12 people.

Attack
The driver was in a BMW vehicle and smashed into the terrace of Cesena Pizzeria, where there were 20 people dining. The driver then tried to reverse, but was stopped. The gendarmes soon arrived at the scene and arrested the driver.

Suspect and investigation
The suspect was later identified as 32-year-old David Patterson, a psychologically unstable and suicidal man thought to have links to the United Kingdom but a French national. He was not known to the police and acted alone, and the attack was not terror related. Patterson lived with his parents in La Ferté-sous-Jouarre and was thought to have been a cannabis smoker since the age of nine. French President Emmanuel Macron sent his condolences to the victims via Twitter. The attack came just five days after another car ramming attack in Paris that injured six people (see Levallois-Perret attack).

References 

2017 road incidents in Europe
21st century in Île-de-France
Attacks on restaurants in Europe
August 2017 crimes in Europe
August 2017 events in France
Crime in Île-de-France
Vehicular rampage in France